Orleans station may refer to:

Transportation
Orleans station (Massachusetts), a former railroad station in Orleans, Massachusetts, United States
Gare d'Orléans, a railway station in Orléans, Loiret department, France
Gare d'Orléans-Austerlitz, the former name of the Gare d'Austerlitz metro station in Paris, France
Gare d'Austerlitz, a railway station in Paris, France originally named Gare d'Orléans
Gare des Aubrais-Orléans, a main-line railway station in Fleury-les-Aubrais, Loiret department, France
Gare de Rouen Orléans, a former railway station in Rouen, Normandy, France
New Orleans Union Passenger Terminal, an intermodal facility in New Orleans, Louisiana, United States
New Orleans Union Station, a former railroad station in New Orleans, Louisiana, United States
Place d'Orléans station, a transitway station in of Ottawa, Ontario, Canada
Porte d'Orléans (Paris Métro), a metro station in Paris, France
L&N Station (New Orleans), a former Louisville and Nashville Railroad station in New Orleans, Louisiana, United States
Southern Railway Terminal (New Orleans), a former Southern Railway station in New Orleans, Louisiana, United States
Southern Railway Freight Office (New Orleans, Louisiana), a former freight station in New Orleans, Louisiana, United States
Texas Pacific - Missouri Pacific Station (New Orleans), a former Texas & Pacific Railway station in New Orleans, Louisiana, United States

Military
Naval Air Station Joint Reserve Base New Orleans, a Navy reserve base in Belle Chasse, Plaquemines Parish, Louisiana, United States
Coast Guard Air Station New Orleans, part of Naval Air Station Joint Reserve Base New Orleans
Naval Support Activity New Orleans, the former name of U.S. Naval Station New Orleans, a Navy repair base in New Orleans, Louisiana, United States

See also
Orleans (disambiguation)